Eleonora (Eliso) Archaia (born July 31, 1967), is a Georgian politician and businesswoman, who is currently serving in Kutaisi City Assembly. She was first elected in 2017. She is a member of the For Georgia party.

Early life and career
Eleonora Archaia was born in the small village of Narazeni in the Samegrelo region. Her father, Jondi Archaia was a factory worker. Her mother, Neli Logua, is a former school teacher. Archaia is the third of four daughters. Archaia spent her early years in Narazeni where she graduated from Narazeni public school in 1984. The same year she moved to Kutaisi, where she studied at the Alexander Tsulukidze’s Kutaisi State Pedagogical Institute, at the Faculty of Methodology of Preschool Education and Psychology From 1984 to 1988. During perestroika, Archaia with her husband established a food processing factory in Kazakhstan and lived there for several years. From 1996 to 1998, she worked as a psychologist at the Kutaisi Economic Lyceum. From 1998 to 2002, she studied Law at Akaki Tsereteli State University. Shortly after, she left Kutaisi and moved to Tbilisi with her family. From 2002 to 2005, she worked at the Ministry of Justice of Georgia, as an advisor to the Human Resources Department. From 2005 to 2017, she held numerous positions in the restaurant and hospitality business and ran a family-owned restaurant chain.

Political career

In August 2017, Archaia announced that she would run for the Kutaisi City Council seat in the 2017 local election, as a candidate of the ruling Georgian Dream party in the Kakhianouri electoral district. She won her seat in the general election, with 49.9% of the vote. Shortly after the election, she was assigned to the Property Management, Economy and Urban Management Commission and Committee on Legal Affairs. The same year she was elected as a Deputy Chairman of the Georgian Dream Caucus.

On October 30, 2018, it was reported by the media that as a result of pressure from local authorities, an independent media agency Imereti News was closed down. The founder of the agency was the son of Eleonora Archaia. He stated that because of direct and indirect threats made against him and his family by Kutaisi Deputy Mayor and Deputy Governor of Imereti, he was forced to temporarily suspend operations of Imereti News Agency.

On February 18, 2021, Giorgi Gakharia resigned as Prime Minister, left the ruling Georgian Dream, and founded a new party in May. In August of the same year, Archaia announced via a Facebook post, that she had left the Georgian Dream and joined Gakharia's newly formed party. In September, Gakharia was nominated Kutaisi mayoral candidate and Party-list of City council members. Archaia was named as a lead candidate for City Assembly. After the 2021 local election, the For Georgia party got 6.71% of the vote and became the third biggest party in the Kutaisi City Assembly. Archaia was elected for the second time.

The day after the election Archaia's car was damaged. window glass was shattered, although her bag and mobile phone were not stolen. She stated that the incident was related to her political activities as she left the ruling party. Nobody has been detained and the case is not closed.

Committee assignments in city council
 Committee on Health and Social Affairs 
 Committee on Finance and Budget
 Gender Equality Council 

Former Committee assignments
 Committee on Legal Affairs (2017-2021)
 Committee on Economy, Property Management and Urban Economy (2017-2021)

Electoral history

2017 Election for Kutaisi City Council District 7

'''

See also
Kutaisi City Assembly
For Georgia

References

1967 births
Living people
21st-century politicians from Georgia (country)
21st-century women politicians from Georgia (country)
Politicians from Georgia (country)
Mingrelians
People from Zugdidi
People from Samegrelo-Zemo Svaneti
People from Kutaisi
politicians from Kutaisi